Antonio Perera Calderón (born 8 June 1997) is a Spanish footballer who plays as a central midfielder for Bulgarian First League club PFC Botev Plovdiv.

Club career
Perera was born in Novelda del Guadiana, Badajoz, Extremadura, and represented CD Gévora, CP Flecha Negra and CD Diocesano as a youth. In 2016, after finishing his formation, he moved to Extremadura UD; initially assigned to the reserves in Tercera División, he also featured for the first team in Segunda División B during the campaign. 

In November 2017, Perera signed a three-year contract with Deportivo Alavés, being assigned to the B-side also in the fourth division. He was a regular starter for the B's during the following years, helping in their promotion to the third level in 2019.

On 19 August 2020, Perera signed a new four-year contract with the Babazorros, being immediately loaned to Croatian First Football League side NK Istra 1961 for one year. He made his professional debut on 8 November, coming on as a late substitute for Slavko Blagojević in 0–5 away loss against GNK Dinamo Zagreb.

On 5 August 2022, Perera was transferred to Bulgarian First League club PFC Botev Plovdiv.

References

External links

1997 births
Living people
Sportspeople from Badajoz
Spanish footballers
Footballers from Extremadura
Association football midfielders
Segunda División B players
Tercera División players
CD Diocesano players
Extremadura UD B players
Extremadura UD footballers
Deportivo Alavés B players
Deportivo Alavés players
Croatian Football League players
NK Istra 1961 players
Botev Plovdiv players
Spanish expatriate footballers
Spanish expatriate sportspeople in Croatia
Spanish expatriate sportspeople in Bulgaria
Expatriate footballers in Croatia
Expatriate footballers in Bulgaria